Fanam was the currency used historically in major parts of South India, especially during the British Raj. Fanam is the anglicized form of the native word , meaning "coin" or "wealth".

Fanam may refer to: 
Madras fanam, a currency issued in Madras Presidency, now part of Tamil Nadu, India
Travancore Fanam, a currency issued in Travancore State, now part of Kerala, India